MRV can refer to:

 Mammalian orthoreovirus
 Merovingian Music
 Mini-rotary viscometer
 Multiple reentry vehicle
 MRV Communications
 MRV Engenharia, a Brazilian homebuilder company
 The IATA code for Mineralnye Vody Airport
 Magnetic resonance venography, a variation of magnetic resonance angiography
 Magnetic resonance velocimetry, an experimental method to obtain velocity fields in fluid mechanics 
 Medium Reconnaissance Vehicle, an Australian M113 armored personnel carrier variant
 "Measurable, reportable, verifiable" – a term qualifying carbon emissions reductions in contexts such as deforestation (REDD)
 Roll Flight MR V, a German powered parachute design